Blenina angulipennis is a moth of the family Nolidae first described by Frederic Moore in 1882. It is found in Taiwan and India.

References

Moths described in 1882
Bleninae